The Apostolic Nunciature to Belarus is an ecclesiastical office of the Catholic Church in Belarus. It is a diplomatic post of the Holy See, whose representative is called the Apostolic Nuncio with the rank of an ambassador.

Representatives of the Holy See to Belarus
Apostolic nuncios
Gabriel Montalvo Higuera (17 April 1993 – unknown)
Agostino Marchetto (18 May 1994 – 13 April 1996)
Dominik Hrušovský (13 April 1996 – 28 July 2001)
Ivan Jurkovič (28 July 2001 – 22 April 2004)
Martin Vidović (15 September 2004 – 2011)
Claudio Gugerotti (15 July 2011 – 13 November 2015)
Gábor Pintér (13 May 2016 – 12 November 2019)
Ante Jozić (21 May 2020 – present)

See also	
Foreign relations of the Holy See
List of diplomatic missions of the Holy See

Notes

References

Belarus
 
Belarus–Holy See relations